Jeff Greene (born December 10, 1954) is an American real estate entrepreneur. He is a member of the Democratic Party and was a candidate in the 2010 Senate election primaries in Florida. He was a candidate in the 2018 Florida Gubernatorial election, but was eliminated in the primary, finishing in fourth place behind eventual nominee Tallahassee Mayor Andrew Gillum, whom Greene later endorsed.

Early life
Greene was born in 1954 in Worcester, Massachusetts to a working class Jewish family.

He graduated from Doherty Memorial High School in Worcester after his family moved to Florida in 1970 when his father lost his business, staying with his great-aunt while he finished school. In Florida, his father worked refilling vending machines and his mother worked as a waitress.

Greene worked many jobs to put himself through college at Johns Hopkins University, graduating in three years with a B.A. in economics and sociology. Later he attended Harvard Business School, where he earned his Master of Business Administration (MBA) degree in 1977. Greene lived in Southern California in the 1980s and 1990s and ran in the 1982 Republican primary for the 23rd Congressional District race. Greene lost the primary to David Armor who then lost to incumbent Democrat Anthony C. Beilenson.

Career
Greene began investing in real estate while in business school, and built a successful real estate business from being a busboy at the Breakers Hotel in Palm Beach. In mid-2006, Greene, worried about the possible collapse of the real estate market, spoke with John Paulson, a fellow investor who discussed with Greene his investing strategy. They agreed that the real estate market was unstable and a bubble might be forming in housing. After the meeting, Greene engaged in a similar investing strategy to that of Paulson, which involved a series of unconventional investments trading credit default swaps. The return on Greene's investments ultimately saved his business, and put him on Forbes 400 list.

2010 US Senate campaign

On April 30, 2010, Greene announced his intention to run as a Democrat for the United States Senate seat held by George LeMieux, saying, "I am an outsider, the only candidate who isn't a career politician. I've succeeded in the real world of hard work – the others have only succeeded at running for political office after office."

Greene stated he would refuse campaign contributions from special interests, and would limit individual donations to $100. His platform focused on economic reforms and job creation.

Greene's campaign was endorsed by the Tallahassee Democrat's editorial board. The board commended Greene for his "edge and an energy that make him want to push beyond the usual talking points", remarking, "we like the toughness he would bring to the office".

Greene's attempt to win the Democratic nomination was, however, unsuccessful; Rep. Kendrick Meek won the primary election before losing to Republican Marco Rubio in the November general election.

Personal life
In 2007, Greene married Chinese Australian real estate executive Mei Sze Chan, who is twenty years his junior in age. Chan is an ethnic Chinese refugee from Malaysia who first fled to Australia with her family before heading to New York City after college. In 2009, she gave birth to their first child, Malcolm. Greene and his wife now have three sons and live in Palm Beach. Greene was quoted as saying, "I just wish I had met Mei Sze 20 years ago".

In February 2011, Greene became a signatory of The Giving Pledge.

References

External links
 
Campaign contributions at OpenSecrets.org

1954 births
American billionaires
American real estate businesspeople
Florida Democrats
Giving Pledgers
21st-century philanthropists
Harvard Business School alumni
Jewish American people in Florida politics
Johns Hopkins University alumni
Living people
People from Palm Beach, Florida
Businesspeople from Worcester, Massachusetts
California Republicans
Candidates in the 1982 United States elections
Candidates in the 2010 United States elections
Candidates in the 2018 United States elections
21st-century American Jews
Doherty Memorial High School alumni